Lalit Surajmal  Kanodia (born 30 March 1941) is an  Indian business entrepreneur. He is chairman of Datamatics Group of Companies which he founded in 1975, national president of the Indo - American Chamber of Commerce and vice president of the Indian Merchants Chamber, both  organizations of the Indian business community.  He has also served as president of the Management Consultants Association of India.

Early life and education

Lalit Kanodia was born in Kolkata (then Calcutta) in West Bengal (India), the son of Shri Surajmal Kanodia, a bullion merchant and Smt. Chandravati Kanodia, a home maker. His family moved to Mumbai in 1942.

Kanodia attended Bombay Scottish School in Mumbai. Besides his academics, he participated in athletics and captained his schools’ football Team. 
Kanodia studied science in Elphinstone College, Bombay University for 2 years. He was then admitted to Indian Institute of Technology Bombay, where he studied Mechanical Engineering. After graduating in 1963, Lalit secured admission to MIT, Cambridge, MA and completed his MS in Management in 1965 with the highest grade in the graduating class. He was awarded the Ford Foundation Fellowship while at MIT. He returned to MIT in 1966 for his PhD in management, which he completed in 1967.  Lalit was a member of the Project MAC at MIT that built Compatible Time-Sharing System and MULTICS (the first two multi-user computer operating systems and precursors to UNIX).

Teaching

While at MIT, Kanodia taught a course on statistical decision theory to MBA students (1964–65). Later, in India he taught MBA students for 2 years (during 1968–70) at the Jamnalal Bajaj Institute of Management Studies, Bombay University.

Tata Consultancy Services

In 1965, JRD Tata, the then chairman of Tata Group was contemplating to start a software company. He asked Kanodia to study the feasibility of computerization within the Tata Group. Kanodia wrote three papers for the Tata Group which led to automation of the Load Dispatch System of the Tata Electric Companies by Westinghouse, Computerization of the electricity billing system of the company and formation of a software development center. Kanodia then returned to MIT for his doctorate. He returned to India to form and head the software development center for the Tata Group. Kanodia formed the Tata Computer Center in 1967, later called Tata Consultancy Services in 1968.

Consulting

While in the United States, Kanodia consulted for Arthur D. Little and the Ford Motor Company. In India, he has been a consultant to the State Bank of India, the Somani Group and the Kamani Group of companies.

Datamatics

Kanodia established his own group of companies called "Datamatics" in 1975 with10 employees. In 1979 he set-up the first dedicated offshore development center for Wang Laboratories.  He also established the first satellite link for Software development from India, between its software development center in Mumbai and AT&T Bell labs USA in 1991. This led to the foundation of BPO services in India and Kanodia formally started another company "Datamatics Technologies Limited" with 100% focus on BPO and KPO services. The start of BPO services helped Datamatics spread its wing globally and it acquired SAZTEC and CorPay, two US based companies in 1997 and 2003 respectively. Since then Datamatics has acquired other companies internationally. As of Lalit is Group Chairman of Datamatics which comprises:
 Datamatics Global Services Ltd (A listed Company with BSE/NSE)
 CIGNEX Datamatics Technologies Ltd 
 Lumina Datamatics Ltd 
 Datamatics Staffing Services Ltd

Personal life

Lalit has four children with his wife Asha Kanodia. Eldest son Rahul Kanodia is vice chairman and CEO of Datamatics Global Services and youngest son Sameer Kanodia is an Executive Director. His two daughters Aneesha and Amrita are married.

Recognition

 Indian Affairs Indian of the year Award for IT, Consulting and BPO services
 Special Achievement Award at Asia Pacific Entrepreneurship Awards
 Global Achiever Award for Business Excellence
 Award from Prime Minister of India for the most innovative software product

Kanodia was president of the Management Consultants' Association of India. He is National President of the Indo - American Chamber of Commerce. He is vice president of Indian Merchants Chamber and chairman of its IT committee.

He was a member of the executive committee of NASSCOM.

He has been Chairman of the Electronic & Computer Software Export Promotion Council (Western Region).
He joined the executive board of the Sloan School of Management, at MIT in 2008.
He served as the Honorary Consul General of Chile in India from 2002 to 2014.

References

Honorary Knights Grand Cross of the Order of the British Empire
MIT Sloan School of Management alumni
Businesspeople from Mumbai
Businesspeople from Haryana
20th-century Indian businesspeople
1941 births
Living people
Indian industrialists
IIT Bombay alumni